Matsitama is a village in Central District of Botswana. The village is located 100 km west of Francistown, the second largest city in Botswana, and has a primary school. The population was 1,030 in 2001 census.

References

Populated places in Central District (Botswana)
Villages in Botswana